Statistics for German World War II military casualties are divergent. The wartime military casualty figures compiled by German High Command, up until January 31, 1945, are often cited by military historians when covering individual campaigns in the war. A recent study by German historian Rüdiger Overmans found that the German military casualties were 5.3 million, including 900,000 men conscripted from outside of Germany's 1937 borders, in Austria and in east-central Europe, higher than those originally reported by the German high command. The German government reported that its records list 4.3 million dead and missing military personnel.

Civilian deaths during the war include air raid deaths, estimates of German civilians killed only by Allied strategic bombing have ranged from around 350,000 to 500,000.
Civilian deaths, due to the flight and expulsion of Germans, Soviet war crimes and the forced labor of Germans in the Soviet Union are disputed and range from 500,000 to over 2.0 million.  According to the German government Suchdienste (Search Service) there were 300,000 German victims (including Jews) of Nazi racial, political and religious persecution. This statistic does not include 200,000 German people with disabilities who were murdered in the Action T4 and Action 14f13 euthanasia programs.

German sources for military casualties

Records of German military search service
In the post-war era the military search service Deutsche Dienststelle (WASt) has been responsible for providing information for the families of those military personnel who were killed or went missing in the war. They maintain the files of over 18 million men who served in the war. By the end of 1954, they had identified approximately 4 million military dead and missing (2,730,000 dead and 1,240,629 missing). (Since German reunification, the records in the former GDR (East Germany) have become available to the WASt). The German Red Cross reported in 2005 that the records of the military search service WAS list total Wehrmacht losses at 4.3 million men (3.1 million dead and 1.2 million missing) in World War II. Their figures include Austria and conscripted ethnic Germans from Eastern Europe.
The German historian Rüdiger Overmans used the files of WASt) to conduct his research project on German military casualties.

Wartime statistics compiled by German High Command (OKW)

The German military system for reporting casualties was based on a numerical reporting of casualties by individual units and a separate listing of the names of individual casualties. The system was not uniform because various military branches such as the Army, Air Force, Navy, Waffen SS and the military hospitals each had different systems of reporting. In early 1945 the German High Command (OKW) prepared a summary of total losses up to January 31, 1945. The German historian Rüdiger Overmans believes, based on his research, that these figures are incomplete and unreliable. According to Overmans, the casualty reporting system broke down in the chaos at the end of the war. Many men who went missing or were taken prisoner were not included in the German High Command (OKW) figures. Overmans maintains that many individual reports of casualties were not processed by the end of the war and are not reflected in the German High Command (OKW) statistics.

The following schedules summarize the OKW figures published in the post-war era.

Reported in the press in 1945
According to a report published by the Reuters News Agency, on July 29 1945 highly confidential archives found at Flensburg, in the house of General Reinecke showed German losses up to November 30, 1944, as 3.6 million, detailed in the following schedule.

Source of figures: Gregory Frumkin. Population Changes in Europe Since 1939, Geneva 1951. Page 72

OKW war diary
Percy Ernst Schramm was responsible for maintaining the official OKW diary during the war. In 1949 he published an article in the newspaper Die Zeit, in which he listed OKW Casualty Figures these figures also appeared in a multi-volume edition of the OKW diaries.

OKW Casualty Figures Sept 1, 1939 to Jan 31, 1945

Source of Figures: Percy Schramm Kriegstagebuch des Oberkommandos der Wehrmacht: 1940—1945: 8 Bde. 1961
() Pages 1508-1511

Notes:

1-These statistics include losses of the Waffen SS as well as Volkssturm and paramilitary serving with the regular forces.

2-These statistics include casualties of the volunteer forces from the Soviet Union. 83,307 dead; 57,258 missing and 118,127 wounded.

3-Included in these statistics are 322,807 POWs held by the US and UK.

4-The figures for Army wounded add up to 4,219,211. Schramm put the total at 4,188,057.

5-Figures of missing include POWs held by Allies.

West German government Statistisches Jahrbuch (Statistical Yearbook).
A. OKW figures from 9/1/1939 to 12/31/1944

Source: Statistisches Jahrbuch für die Bundesrepublik Deutschland 1960, Page 78

B. Monthly Field Army (Feldheer) casualties September 1939 to November 1944

Notes: Figures include Waffen SS, Austrians and conscripted ethnic Germans. Figures for missing include POW held by Allies. Source: Statistisches Jahrbuch für die Bundesrepublik Deutschland 1960, Page 78

Das Heer 1933–1945  by Burkhart Müller-Hillebrand
In 1969, the West German military historian Burkhart Müller-Hillebrand (de) published the third volume of his study of the German Army in World War II Das Heer 1933–1945 that listed OKW casualty figures and his estimate of total German casualties. Müller-Hillebrand maintained that the OKW figures did not present an accurate accounting of German casualties because they understated losses in the final months of the war on the eastern front and post war deaths of POW in Soviet captivity. According to Müller-Hillebrand actual irrecoverable losses in the war were between 3.3 and 4.5 million men. Overall Müller-Hillebrand estimated the total dead and missing at 4.0 million men.

A. Losses Reported by OKW September 1 1939April 30 1945 (For all branches of service)

Source: Müller-Hillebrand Das Heer 1933–1945 Vol 3. Page 262

The figure of 1,277,000 killed and missing from January 1 1945 - April 30 1945 was estimated by the U.S. Army in the 1947 report German Manpower

B. Field Army (Feldheer) casualties September 1939 to November 1944

Source: Müller-Hillebrand Das Heer 1933–1945 Vol 3. Page 264

C. Field Army (Feldheer) casualties September 1939 to November 1944

Source: Müller-Hillebrand Das Heer 1933–1945 Vol.3 Page 265

Strength by service branch

Source:Geschichte des Zweiten Weltkreiges, A.G Ploetz verlag -Würzburg 1960 pp. 122–24

Statistical study by Rüdiger Overmans
The German historian Rüdiger Overmans in 2000 published the study Deutsche militärische Verluste im Zweiten Weltkrieg (German Military Casualties in the Second World War), which has provided a reassessment of German military war dead based on a statistical survey of German military personnel records. The financial support for the study came from a private foundation. When Overmans conducted his research project during 1992 to 1994 he was an officer in the German Armed Forces. Overmans was an associate of the German Armed Forces Military History Research Office from 1987 until 2004 and was on the faculty of the University of Freiburg from 1996 to 2001. In 1992 when Overmans began the project, German military dead in the war listed at the military search service Deutsche Dienststelle (WASt) were 4.3 million men (3.1 million confirmed dead and 1.2 missing and presumed dead). Since the collapse of communism previously classified documentation regarding German military casualties became available to German researchers.

The research project involved taking a statistical sample of the confidential German military personnel records located at the (WASt). The project sought to determine total deaths and their cause, when and in which theatre of war the losses occurred as well as a demographic profile of the men who served in the war. Nineteen employees at Deutsche Dienststelle assisted in the survey. The personnel records included 3,070,000 men who were confirmed dead in the Death Files and another 15,200,000 men in the General Files who had served in the war including those listed as missing and presumed dead. The total sample pulled for the research consisted of the files of 4,844 personnel dead or missing in military service during the war: The first group 4,137 from Army, Air Force and 172 from Waffen SS and paramilitary organizations including (3,051 confirmed dead from the Death Files and another 1,258 found to be dead or missing in the General Files) The Second Group of 535 men found to be dead or missing was selected from the separate Navy files. Overmans maintains that based on the size of the sample selected that there was a 99% confidence level that the results were accurate. The research by Overmans concluded in 2000 that the total German military dead and missing were 5,318,000. The results of the Overmans research project were published with the endorsement of the German Armed Forces Military History Research Office of the Federal Ministry of Defense (Germany).

The following schedules give a brief overview of the Overmans study.

Of the 2 million presumed dead, Overmans believes 700,000 died in Soviet custody without being reported as POWs.

Overmans states that there is not sufficient data to break down the 1,230,045 deaths in the 1945 "final battles" in Germany between the Western Allied invasion of Germany and Eastern Front in 1945, although he estimates that 2/3 of these casualties can be attributed to the Eastern Front. This proportion (2/3 East vs. 1/3 West) contradicts the Heeresarzt weekly casualty reports for the army regarding the period from 1.1.-20.4.1945, according to which ca. 83% of the KIA and 87% of the WIA in the "final battles" occurred in the East.For the entire year 1945 Overmans puts total losses at 1,540,000 (1,230,045 in the final battles; 57,495 in other theaters and 252,188 POW). Overmans 1,230,045 figure for the "final battles" includes (1) killed, (2) missing, (3) otherwise deceased "without prisoners of war", as is differentiated on p. 272. The missing (697,319) does not include confirmed deaths in captivity, however on page 288 Overmans mentions 400,000 missing in the East in 1945 and states that this figure of missing was based on his finding that two thirds of deaths during the "final battles" occurred in the East of Germany. He further argues (p. 289) that about half of the 1,536,000 missing in the East between 1941 and 1945, according to his calculations, may well have died in Soviet captivity. On the other hand, Overmans states that "300,000 soldiers per month" (p. 275), "that is, 10,000 men per day" (p. 279, cf. p. 283, also stated in the introduction) actually died in 1945. Overall, Overmans estimates losses for the entire war on the Eastern front at 4 million and in the West 1 million.

Monthly German military casualties at point of death per Overmans study. (Not including living POWs still held.)

Notes: Figures include Waffen SS, Austrians, conscripted ethnic Germans, Volkssturm, and other paramilitary forces. Figures do not include prisoners held by Allies. Prisoners held during the war are listed in a separate schedule below. Monthly figures do not add because of rounding.

Soviet sources reported that "In 1945 the German Army lost more than 1,000,000 men killed on the Soviet-German front alone."

Figures do not include POW deaths of 363,000 in Soviet captivity; these losses were listed separately by Overmans.

According to Overmans there are no reliable figures to breakout the national origin for the figure of 900,000 men of German ancestry conscripted into the Waffen-SS Overmans maintains that records of the Deutsche Dienststelle (WASt) surveyed only persons of German ancestry  "deutsche nach Abstammung"  However Polish sources maintain that during the war the Germans forcibly conscripted ethnic Poles into the German military.  Professor Ryszard Kaczmarek of the University of Silesia in Katowice, author of a monograph titled Polacy w Wehrmachcie ("Poles in the Wehrmacht") noted that many Polish citizens in the Polish areas annexed by Nazi Germany were forcibly conscripted in Upper Silesia and in Pomerania. They were declared citizens of the Third Reich by law and therefore subject to drumhead court-martial in case of draft evasion.  A 1958 West German estimate put the military war dead of ethnic German(deutschen Bevölkerung) foreign nationals from east-central Europe in the German Armed Forces at 432,000 (Baltic States 15,000, Poland 108,000, Czechoslovakia 180,000, Hungary 32,000, Yugoslavia 40,000 and Romania 35,000)

Overmans does not include Russian volunteers in the Wehrmacht in his figures, only persons of German ancestry (Deutsche nach Abstammung). According to Overmans there is no reliable data on losses of Soviet volunteers Russian military historian G. I. Krivosheev estimated losses in the Wehrmacht of volunteer formations and SS troops (Vlasovites, Balts, Muslims etc.) at 215,000. The statistics of the German High Command put casualties of the volunteer forces from the Soviet Union up until 1/31/1945 at: 83,307 dead; 57,258 missing and 118,127 wounded

Comparison of figures at 12/31/1944 of Overmans and German High Command
Overmans maintains that his research project taking a statistical sample of the records of the Deutsche Dienststelle (WASt) found that the German military casualty reporting system broke down during the war and that losses were understated. The following schedule compares the total dead and living POW according to Overmans at 12/31/1944 with the figures of the German High Command.

German prisoners of war
See also: German prisoners of war in northwest Europe, German prisoners of war in the Soviet Union and German prisoners of war in the United States

The fates of German prisoners of war have been a concern in post war Germany. By 1950 the Soviets reported that they had repatriated all German prisoners of war except a small number of convicted war criminals. During the cold war in West Germany there were claims that one million German prisoners of war were held in secret by the USSR. The West German government set up the Maschke Commission to investigate the fate of German POW in the war; in its report of 1974 the Maschke Commission found that about 1.2 million German military personnel reported as missing more than likely died as POWs, including 1.1 million in the USSR. Based on his research, Rüdiger Overmans believes that the deaths of 459,000 dead POWs can be confirmed in the files of Deutsche Dienststelle (WASt)(including 363,000 in the USSR). Overmans estimates the actual death toll of German POWs is about 1.1 million men (including 1.0 million in the USSR); he maintains that among those reported as missing were men who actually died as prisoners. Data from the Soviet Archives published by G. I. Krivosheev put the deaths in the USSR of German POWs at 450,600 including 356,700 in NKVD camps and 93,900 in transit. After the collapse of communism, data from the Soviet Archives became available concerning the deaths of German POWs in the USSR. In recent years there has been a joint Russian-German project to investigate the fate of POWs in the war.

According to the records of the western Allies 2.8 million German soldiers surrendered on the Western Front between D-day and the end of April 1945; 1.3 million between D-day and March 31, 1945,; and 1.5 million of them in the month of April. From early March these surrenders seriously weakened the Wehrmacht in the West, and made further surrenders more likely, thus having a snowballing effect.  On March 27 Eisenhower declared at a press conference that the enemy were a whipped army .  In March the daily rate of POWs taken on the Western Front was 10,000; in the first 14 days of April it rose to 39,000 and in the last 16 days the average peaked at 59,000 soldiers captured each day. The number of prisoners taken in the west in March and April was over 1,800,000, more than double the 800,000 German soldiers who surrendered to the Russians in the last three or four months of the war. One reason for this huge difference, possibly the most important,  was that German forces facing the Red Army tended to fight to the end for fear of Soviet captivity whereas German forces facing the Western Allies tended to surrender without putting up much if any resistance. Accordingly, the number of German killed and wounded was much higher in the East than in the West.

The Western Allies also took 134,000 German soldiers prisoner in North Africa
, and at least 220,000 by the end of April 1945 in the Italian campaign
. The total haul of German POWs held by the Western Allies by April 30, 1945, in all theatres of war was over 3,150,000, rising in NW Europe to 7,614,790 after the end of the war.

It is worth noting that the allied armies which captured the 2.8 million German soldiers up to April 30, 1945, while Adolf Hitler was still alive and resisting as hard as he could, comprised at their peak 88 divisions, with a peak strength in May 1945 of 2,639,377 in the US and 1,095,744 in the British and Canadian forces.  The casualties suffered by the Western Allies in making this contribution to the defeat of the Wehrmacht were relatively light, 164,590–195,576 killed/missing, 537,590 wounded, and 78,680 taken prisoner, a total loss of 780,860 to 811,846 to inflict a loss of 2.8 million prisoners on the German army. The number of dead and wounded on both sides was about equal. This, plus the fact that most surrenders occurred in April 1945, suggests that (unlike on the Eastern Front (World War II), where the number of German killed and wounded far exceeded the number of prisoners taken by the Soviets), most German soldiers who surrendered to the Western Allies did so without a fight. For instance, in the battle of the Ruhr Pocket, there were about 10,000 fatalities on the German side (including prisoners of war in German captivity, foreign forced laborers, Volkssturm militia and unarmed civilians), whereas about 317,000 Germans surrendered. "Many a German walked mile after mile before finding an American not too occupied with other duties to bother to accept his surrender." For comparison, in the Battle of Halbe on the Eastern Front from 24 April to 1 May 1945, over 30,000 German soldiers, out of a much smaller number encircled, were killed fighting the Red Army.

Source of figures-Rüdiger Overmans, Soldaten hinter Stacheldraht. Deutsche Kriegsgefangene des Zweiten Weltkrieges. Page 246.

Source of figures Deutsche militärische Verluste im Zweiten Weltkrieg page 286

Source:Rüdiger Overmans Soldaten hinter Stacheldraht. Deutsche Kriegsgefangene des Zweiten Weltkriege. Ullstein Taschenbuch vlg., 2002 Pages 272-273

Overmans has made the following points in Deutsche militärische Verluste im Zweiten Weltkrieg
 Based on his research Overmans believes that the total of 459,000 dead POWs listed in the files of Deutsche Dienststelle (WASt) is understated. He maintains that included with the 2 million reported as missing and presumed dead (see above scheduleTotal Missing and Presumed Dead) were those in fact dead in custody as POWs. He points out that this will not increase the number of German war dead because some of those reported missing would be reclassified as dead POWs. He believes further research is needed on the fate of the POWs.
 He believes that in addition to the 363,000 confirmed POW dead in the USSR, it seems entirely plausible, while not provable, that 700,000 German military personnel listed with the missing actually died in Soviet custody
 He believes that personnel captured on the battlefield may have died of wounds or in transit before being recorded as POW. He pointed out that this was the case of some Germans in American and British hospitals.
 He maintains "Otherwise viewing the case of France, where the figures of the Maschke Commission are based on official French data; an important point to presume, that from the 180,000 missing on the Western front, many were dead in fact in French custody, or soldiers in Indochina.
 He pointed out that the heavy death toll estimated by the Maschke Commission of 80,000 German POW in Yugoslavia was based on documented eyewitness accounts.

Russian sources
The Russian military historian G. I. Krivosheev has published figures for the casualties on all fronts compiled by the German High Command up until April 30 1945 based on captured German records in the Soviet Archives.

Krivosheev gave a separate set of statistics that put losses at 2,230,000 Killed; 2,400,000 missing and 5,240,000 wounded.
According to Krivosheev "The figures in the Wehrmacht documents relating to Germany's war losses are therefore contradictory and unreliable."

Based on Soviet sources Krivosheev put German losses on the Eastern Front from 1941-1945 at 6,923,700 men: includingkilled 4,137,100, taken prisoner 2,571,600 and 215,000 dead among Russian volunteers in the Wehrmacht. Deaths of POW were 450,600 including 356,700 in NKVD camps and 93,900 in transit.
Soviet sources claimed that "In 1945 the German Army lost more than 1,000,000 men killed on the Soviet-German front alone."

German casualties in English language sources
Estimated figures for German World War II casualties are divergent and contradictory. The authors of the Oxford Companion to World War II maintain that casualty statistics are notoriously unreliable The following is a list of published statistics for German casualties in World War II.
 Encyclopædia Britannica, article World Wars (2010) Military-killed, died of wounds or in prison3,500,000; wounded5,000,000; prisoners or missing3,400,000; civilian deaths due to war780,000. Estimated total deaths4,200,000. (Military deaths include men conscripted outside of Germany, in addition perhaps 250,000 died of natural causes, suicide or were executed. Civilian deaths do not include Austria or 2,384,000 deaths in the Flight and expulsion of Germans (1944–50)
 Oxford Companion to World War II (2005) Military lossesGermany 4,500,000, Austria 230,000 Civilian lossesGermany 2,000,000, Austria 144,000. Total losses for Germany and Austria6,874,000.
 World War II Desk Reference (2004) 1,810,061 combat deaths and 1,902,704 missing and presumed dead, total 3,712,865. Civilians killed 3,600,000.
 Encyclopedia of World War Two (2004) Battle deaths 2,049,872; wounded 4,879,875; missing in action 1,902,704. Civilians dead 410,000.
 Warfare and Armed Conflicts – A Statistical Reference (2002) Total military dead all causes 3,250,000 including battle deaths of 2,850,000; wounded 7,250,000. Civilian deaths 593,000 in Anglo-American bombing (including 56,000 foreign workers and 40,000 Austrians), 10,000 killed in the crossfire in the west and 619,000 lost to Soviets and their allies in the east.
 Atlas of the Second World War (1997) Germany-military dead 2,850,000; civilian dead 2,300,000. Austria- military dead 380,000; civilian dead 145,000.
 World War II – A statistical Survey (1993) Military killed and Missing 3,250,000; wounded 4,606,600. Civilians 2,050,000 by Allies and 300,000 by Germans.
 Harper Encyclopedia of Military History (1993) Military- 2,850,000 dead and 7,250,000 wounded. Civilian dead 500,000.
 Alan Bullock (1992)- Military dead 3,250,000 and 3,600,000 to 3,810,000 civilian dead.
 John Keegan (1990) over 4 million military dead; 593,000 civilians died under air attack; possibly 1.0 million civilians died in the flight from the Red Army. An additional 2.1 million civilians perished in the expulsions from Eastern Europe.
 Rudolph Rummel (1990-1997)- According to the calculations of R. J. Rummel the combined German and Austrian death toll due to the war and political killings by governments (Democide) in the World War II era was 10.1 million persons. Rummel's maintains that his figures for war dead exclude political killings by governments. The details of Rummel's estimates are as follows.

A. German war dead- 5,200,000 (3,200,000 military and 2,000,000 civilians) B. Nazi Democide 895,000 (762,000 in Germany and 133,000 in Austria) C. Soviet Democide- 1,576,000, (469,000 civilians and 1,107,000 German POW) C. British Democide- 378,000 civilians killed in area bombing of Germany D. United States Democide- 37,000 (32,000 civilians killed in area bombing of Germany and 5,000 German POW.) E. French Democide-23,000 German POW. F. Yugoslav Democide- 145,000 (75,000 ethnic Germans and 70,000 POW)g. Hungarian Democide-12,000 ethnic GermansH. Expulsion of the Germans after World War II- 1,863,000 (Poland 1,583,000, Czechoslovakia 197,000 and Yugoslavia 82,000)
 Wars and War-Related Deaths 1700-1987 (1987)- Germany/Austria total deaths 6,626,000 - Germany (military 4,750,000; civilians 1,471,000), Austria (military 280,000; civilians 125,000)
 Melvin Small and J. David Singer (1982) Germany military dead 3,250,000
 Quincy Wright (1965) Germany total deaths 3,750,000 - (military 3,250,000; civilians 500,000)
 English language sources have put the death toll at 2 to 3 million for the flight and expulsion of the Germans. These figures are based on the West German government figures from the 1960s .

United States Army Figures for German and Italian Losses
According to the report of General George Marshall issued in 1945 the "breakdown of German and Italian losses against American, British, and French forces" in the war in Europe was as follows:

Source of figures: Biennial report of the Chief of Staff of the United States Army to the Secretary of War : July 1, 1943, to June 30, 1945

(A) 252,415 Germans and Italians were captured in Tunisia  According to the Imperial War Museum Following the Italian surrender in 1943, 100,000 Italians volunteered to work as 'co-operators'. They were given considerable freedom and mixed with local people. Italian fascist forces fought in the Italian campaign until the end of the war with the Italian Social Republic

(B) Includes 3,404,949 disarmed enemy forces.

The Biennial report of the Chief of Staff of the United States Army issued in 1945 also estimated Japanese "battle dead" at 1.219 million. Marshall's figures of enemy battle deaths are juxtaposed with deaths in the US Army only, suggesting that the losses of Japanese naval forces are not included, nor Japanese casualties in theaters where the Americans were not the main opposing force. Japanese government figures from 2003 put their military war dead at 2.3 million. According to the Japanese Relief Bureau of the Ministry of Health and Welfare in March 1964, a total of 2,121,000 Japanese servicemen perished in WWII. Of these 1,647,200 were in the army and 473,800 were in the naval forces. Of the army dead a total of 1,456,500 occurred on the battlefronts that Marshall's figures refer to (Southern Pacific, Central Pacific, India-Burma, China and Aleutians.) Marshall's figure for China is much lower than that of the Relief Bureau (126,000 vs. 435,600), but for the theaters where Japanese forces confronted American and British Empire forces the sum of Marshall's figures (1,093,000) is slightly higher than the sum of the Relief Bureau's figures for these theaters (1,020,900).

Demographic estimates of military losses
Based on information available in January 1946, the Metropolitan Life Insurance Co. put German military dead at 3,250,000. According to Gregory Frumkin this presumably referred to aggregate German forces including those conscripted outside the 1937 German borders.

In 1951, Gregory Frumkin, who was throughout its existence the editor of the Statistical Year Book of the League of Nations, provided an assessment of German military losses based on a demographic analysis of the European population from 1939 to 1947. Frumkin put total German military dead and missing at 3,975,000: Germany (1937 borders) 3,500,000; Austria 230,000; 200,000 Sudeten Germans from Czechoslovakia; 40,000 from France, 3,700 from the Netherlands; 700 from Norway and 398 from Denmark.

The West German government in November 1949, based on an analysis of the population balance for Germany within its 1937 borders, put German military losses at 3,250,000: 1,650,000 killed and 1,600,000 missing. Figures exclude Austria and conscripted ethnic Germans from Eastern Europe

A demographic analysis of the population balance by the West German government in 1960 put the total military losses of the Wehrmacht at 4,440,000; 3,760,000 for Germany (1937 borders); 430,000 conscripted ethnic Germans from Eastern Europe and 250,000 from Austria.

Civilian casualties

Air raid deaths

Official statistics published by the West German government 1956 put the death toll due to air raids at 635,000. However, estimates from other sources tend to be lower, ranging from 305,000 to 500,000 persons killed by Allied bombing of German cities.

1956 West German government report
The schedule below details the statistics published by the West German government 1956. They estimated 635,000 total deaths, 500,000 due to the strategic bombing of Germany and an additional 135,000 killed in air raids during the 1945 flight and evacuations on the eastern front. The civilian deaths in the air raids on eastern Front after 1/31/1945 are also included with the figures of the losses during the Flight and expulsion of Germans (1944–50)

 Civilian bombing deaths (not including refugees) of 436,000 include 350,000 dead, 54,000 died of wounds and 32,000 missing and presumed dead.
 Of the 350,000 civilians listed as dead (not including refugees), 126,000 of the deaths occurred after January 31, 1945.
 Included in the total of 635,000 air raid dead were losses for Germany in 1937 borders which totaled 593,000. 465,000 not including refugees (410,000 civilians, 32,000 foreigners and POW and 23,000 military and Police); and losses of 128,000 refugees on eastern front  (127,000 civilians and 1,000 military and Police)
 The Austrian government puts their losses in the air war at 24,000. This figure is included in the schedule above.

Sources for figures in schedule:

(1) Hans Sperling, Die Luftkriegsverluste während des zweiten Weltkriegs in Deutschland, Wirtschaft und Statistik October 1956, journal published by Statistisches Bundesamt Deutschland. (German government Statistical Office)

(2) Statistisches Jahrbuch für die Bundesrepublik Deutschland 1960, Page 78.

(3) Erich Hampe "Der Zivile Luftschutz im Zweiten Weltkrieg" pp.138-142

The United States Strategic Bombing Survey
The United States Strategic Bombing Survey gave three different figures for German air raid deaths

1-The summary report of September 30, 1945 put total casualties for the entire period of the war at 305,000 killed and 780,000 wounded.

2- The section Effects of Strategic Bombing on the German War Economy of October 31, 1945 put the losses at 375,000 killed and 625,000 wounded

3-The section The Effect of Bombing on Health and Medical Care in Germany of January 1947 made a preliminary calculated estimate of air raid dead at 422,000 According to the report "no complete and accurate figures on German civilian air raid casualties, covering the entire period of the war, are available". The authors maintain that the German figures for 1940 through 1943 of 111,000 killed was generally correct and that their estimate of 311,000 dead for the years 1944 and 1945 was based on the tons of bombs dropped and the population size of the cities bombed. Regarding overall losses they concluded that "It was further estimated that an additional number, approximately 25% of known deaths in 1944 and 1945, were still unrecovered and unrecorded. With an addition of this estimate of 1944 and 1945 unrecorded deaths, the final estimation gave in round numbers a half a million German civilians killed by Allied aerial attacks"

Analysis by Richard Overy
Historian Richard Overy in 2014 published a study of the air war The Bombers and the Bombed: Allied Air War Over Europe 1940-1945 in which he disputed the official German figures of air war dead. He estimated total air raid deaths at 353,000. The main points of Overy's analysis are as follows.
 Overy maintains that the German estimates are based on incorrect speculations for losses during the final months of the war when there was a gap in the record keeping system. He points out that the figures for air raid dead in the last three months of the war were estimated in the West German figures at 300,000, which includes the deaths of 135,000 eastern refugees fleeing westward,  Overy believes that this is not plausible. The official German figures for the final months of the war include the inflated total of 60,000 deaths from the Bombing of Dresden – Overy notes that the latest research puts the Dresden death toll at approximately 25,000, less than half the West German estimate
 Overy based his analysis on data in German archival sources for the years 1940-1942 and the Civilian Defense Division report of United States Strategic Bombing Survey for the period January 1943 to January 1945. These archival sources indicated a total of 271,188 air raid deaths from the beginning of the war until the end of January 1945. Overy noted that "No doubt this does not include all those who were killed or died of wounds, but it does include uniformed personnel, POWs, and foreign workers, and it applies to the Greater German area". Using the United States Strategic Bombing Survey data Overy calculated an average monthly death toll of 18,777 from September 1944 to January 1945, taking this monthly average he estimated losses of 57,000 from February to April 1945 to which he adds an additional 25,000 killed in Dresden for total deaths of 82,000 from February to April 1945. The figures up until the end of January 1945 of 271,000 and the 82,000 from February to April 1945 give an overall figure of 353,000 air war deaths. Overy summarizes: "Detailed reconstruction of deaths caused by the Royal Air Force bombing from February to May 1945, though incomplete, suggests a total of at least 57,000. If casualties inflicted by the American air forces are assumed to be lower, since their bombing was less clearly aimed at cities, an overall death toll of 82,000 is again statistically realistic. In the absence of unambiguous statistical evidence, the figure of 353,000 gives an approximate scale consistent with the evidence".

Other estimates of air raid deaths
 A 2005 report by the German Red Cross put the death toll due to strategic bombing at 500,000.
 A 1990 study by the East German historian :de:Olaf Groehler estimated 360,000–370,000 civilians were killed by Allied strategic bombing within the 1937 German boundaries, for the German Reich including Austria, forced laborers, POW and military the total is estimated at 406,000. In 2005 Groehler's figures were published in the authoritative series The German Reich and the Second World War
 The estimate by West German government in November 1949 for Germany in 1937 borders was 450,000 killed in bombing and 50,000 in ground fighting. Figures do not include Austria.
 The British PM Clement Attlee in a statement to Parliament on 22 October 1945 put the German death toll in the bombing campaign at 350,000

Civilians killed in 1945 military campaign
The West German government in made a rough estimate in 1956 of 20,000 civilians killed during the 1945 military campaign in current post war German borders, not including the former German territories in Poland. However, there is a more recent estimate of 22,000 civilians killed during the fighting in Berlin only. Not included in these figures are civilians who died in the fighting and atrocities in East-Prussia (Konigsberg, Pillau), Pommerania (Danzig, Kolberg) and Silesia (Breslau). The losses of civilians from East-Central Europe in the 1945 are included with the expulsion dead, the German Archives report of 1974 estimated 150,000 violent deaths of civilians in East-Central Europe during the 1945 military campaign.

Deaths due to Nazi political, racial and religious persecution
The West German government put the number of Germans killed by the Nazi political, racial and religious persecution at 300,000 (including 160,000 German Jews)

A 2003 report by the German Federal Archive put the total murdered during the Action T4 Euthanasia program at over 200,000 persons. Previously it was reported that 70,000 persons were murdered in the euthanasia program, recent research in the archives of the former East Germany indicate that the number of victims in Germany and Austria was about 200,000.

NKVD special camps in East Germany 1945–1950
The Soviets set up NKVD special camps in the Soviet-occupied parts of Germany and areas east of the Oder-Neisse line to intern Germans accused of alleged ties to the Nazis, or because they were hindering the establishment of Stalinism in East Germany. Between 122,000 and 150,000 were detained and at least 43,000 did not survive.

Expulsion of Germans after World War II and the forced labor of Germans in the Soviet Union
See Also: Flight and expulsion of Germans (1944–50) and Forced labor of Germans in the Soviet Union

Civilian deaths, due to the flight and expulsion of Germans and the forced labor of Germans in the Soviet Union, are sometimes included with World War II casualties. During the Cold War, the West German government estimated the death toll at 2.225 million in the wartime evacuations, forced labor in the Soviet Union as well as the post war expulsions. This figure was to remain unchallenged until the 1990s when some German historians put the actual death toll in the expulsions at 500,000 confirmed deaths listed in a 1965 German Red Cross study. The German Historical Museum puts the figure at 600,000 dead; they maintain the figure of 2 million expulsion deaths cannot be supported. However, the position of the German government, the German Federal Agency for Civic Education and the German Red Cross is that the death toll in the expulsions is between 2.0 and 2.5 million civilians. The German historian Rüdiger Overmans maintains that there are more arguments for a lower figure of 500,000 rather than the higher figures of over 2.0 million. He believes that the previous studies by the German government should be subject to critical revision and new research is needed to establish the actual number of expulsion deaths.

The following studies were published by the West German government estimating expulsion deaths.
 In 1950 the West German government made a preliminary estimate of 3,000,000 German civilians missing in Eastern Europe (1.5 million from pre war Germany and 1.5 million ethnic Germans from East Europe) whose fate needed to be clarified. This estimate was later superseded by the 1958 German Government demographic study.
 The Schieder commission from 1953 to 1961 estimated 2.3 million civilian deaths in the expulsions- Germany in 1937 borders the Oder-Neisse region 2,167,000 (figure includes 500,000 military and 50,000 air raid dead); Poland (1939 borders) 217,000, Free City of Danzig 100,000; Czechoslovakia 225,600; Yugoslavia 69,000; Rumania 10,000; Hungary 6,000 The statistical information in the Schieder Report was later superseded by the 1958 German Government demographic study.
 The West German government statistical office issued a report in 1958 that put the number of civilians dead or missing in the expulsions and forced labor in the USSR at 2,225,000(including 1,339,000 for Germany in 1937 borders; Poland 185,000, Danzig 83,200; Czechoslovakia 272,900; Yugoslavia 135,800; Rumania 101,000; Hungary 57,000; Baltic States 51,400. The figures include those killed in the 1945 military campaign and the forced labor of Germans in the Soviet Union. The figures from this report are often cited by historians writing in the English language. Rüdiger Overmans pointed out that these figures represent persons whose fate had not been clarified, not necessarily dead as a result of the expulsions.
 The West German government set up a unified body the Suchdienst (search service) of the German churches working in conjunction with the German Red Cross to trace the individual fates of those who were dead or missing as result of the expulsions and deportations. In 1965 the final report was issued by the search service which was able to confirm 473,013 civilian deaths in Eastern Europe; and an additional 1,905,991 cases whose fate could not be determined. This report remained confidential until 1987. Rüdiger Overmans presented a summary of this data at a 1994 historical symposium in Poland.
 In 1974, the West German Federal Archive (Bundesarchiv) issued a report to "compile and evaluate information available in the Federal Archives and elsewhere regarding crimes and brutalities committed against Germans in the course of the expulsion". The report estimated 600,000 civilian deaths (150,000 violent Deaths during war in 1945; 200,000 in Forced labor of Germans in the Soviet Union and 250,000 in post war internment Camps and forced labor in Eastern Europe) In particular, the report identified deaths due to crimes against international law: the 1958 report of the Federal Office for Statistics listed as "post-war losses" two million people whose fate remained unaccounted for in the population balance, but who according to the 1974 report were "not exclusively victims of crimes against international law" such as post war deaths due to malnutrition and disease.

Recent research on German expulsion losses:
 The Deutsches Historisches Museum puts the number of dead at 600,000, they maintain the official figure of 2 million cannot be supported.
 In his 2000 study of German military casualties Rüdiger Overmans found 344,000 additional military deaths of Germans from the Former eastern territories of Germany and conscripted ethnic Germans from Eastern Europe. Overmans believes this will reduce the number of civilians previously listed as missing in the expulsions. Overmans did not investigate civilian expulsion losses, only military casualties, he merely noted that other studies estimated of expulsion losses from about 500,000 to 2,000,000. Overmans maintains that there are more arguments for a lower figure of 500,000 rather than the higher figures of over 2.0 million. He believes new research on the number of expulsion deaths is needed since only 500,000 of the reported 2,000,00 deaths have been confirmed.
 The German historian Ingo Haar maintains that civilian losses in the expulsions have been overstated for decades by the German government for political reasons. Haar argues that during the Cold War the West German government put political pressure on the Statistisches Bundesamt to push the figures upward to agree to the Search Service combined total of 2.3 million dead and missing. Haar maintains that the Search Service figure of 1.9 million missing persons is based on unreliable information and that the actual death toll in the expulsions is between 500 and 600,000 which is based on confirmed deaths.
 The German historians Hans Henning Hahn and Eva Hahn have published a detailed study of the flight and expulsions that is sharply critical of official German accounts of the cold war era. The Hahn's believe that the official German figure of 2 million deaths is a historical myth that lacks foundation. The Hahn's point out that the figure of 473,013 confirmed deaths includes 80,522 in the post war period; they maintain that most of the deaths occurred during the Nazi organized flight and evacuation during the war, and the Forced labor of Germans in the Soviet Union. They place the ultimate blame for the mass flight and expulsion on the wartime policy of the Nazis in Eastern Europe.
 In 2006 the German government reaffirmed its belief that 2.0 to 2.5 million civilians perished in the flight and expulsion from Eastern Europe. They maintain that the figure is correct because it includes additional deaths from malnutrition and disease of those civilians subject to the expulsions. State Secretary in the German Federal Ministry of the Interior, Christoph Bergner, outlined the stance of the respective governmental institutions in Deutschlandfunk saying that the numbers presented by the German government and others are not contradictory to the numbers cited by Haar, and that the below 600,000 estimate comprises the deaths directly caused by atrocities during the expulsion measures and thus only includes people who on the spot were raped, beaten, or else brought to death, while the above two millions estimate also includes people who on their way to post-war Germany have died of epidemics, hunger, cold, air raids and the like.

Total population losses 1939–1946
Estimated total German population losses (in 1937 German borders) directly related to the war range between 5.5 to 6.9 million persons. These figures do not include ethnic Germans from other nations in the German military and ethnic German civilians who were killed in expulsions. In 1956 the West German government figures in the table below list an estimated about 5.5 million deaths (military and civilian) directly caused by the war within the borders of 1937. A study by the German demographer Peter Marschalck put the total deaths directly related to the war both military and civilians at 5.2 million, plus an estimated decline in births of 1.7 million, bringing total population losses related to the war at 6.9 million persons within the borders of 1937. There were additional deaths of the ethnic Germans outside of Germany in Eastern Europe, men conscripted during the war and ethnic German civilian deaths during post war expulsions.

German government figures (2005)
In 2005 the German government Suchdienste (Search Service) put the total combined German military and civilian war dead at 7,375,800, including ethnic Germans outside of Germany and Austrians. This figure includes 4.3 million military dead and missing, 500,000 killed by strategic bombing, 300,000 victims of Nazi political, racial and religious persecution, 2,251,500 civilian dead in expulsions and 24,300 Austrian civilians.

Population balance for Germany in 1937 borders (not including Austria or the ethnic Germans of East Europe): May 1939 to October 1946

Notes:

 -Population May 1939 Census- These figures are for Germany in 1937 borders, they do not include Austria or the ethnic Germans of East Europe.
 -Live Births- are those actually recorded from May 1939 until June 1944 and from January to October 1946. The gap in vital statistics between the middle of 1944 and the end of 1945 was estimated.
 -Net Immigration-German Refugees were ethnic Germans of Eastern Europe who lived outside Germany in 1937 borders before the war.
 -Civilian Deaths- These are deaths due to natural causes not directly related to the war. Figure includes deaths actually recorded from May 1939 until June 1944 and from January to October 1946. The gap in vital statistics between the middle of 1944 and the end of 1945 was estimated. The German government Statistical Office figures in the above table put the deaths due to natural causes at 7,130,000. A study by the German demographer Peter Marschalck estimated the expected deaths from natural causes based on the peacetime death rate would have been 5,900,000. The German economist :de:Bruno Gleitze from the German Institute for Economic Research estimated that included in the total of 7.1 million deaths by natural causes that there were 1,2 million excess deaths caused by an increase in mortality due to the harsh conditions in Germany during and after the war In Allied occupied Germany the shortage of food was an acute problem in 1946–47 the average kilocalorie intake per day was only 1,600 to 1,800, an amount insufficient for long-term health.,
 -Killed in Air war - Figure for civilians only, does not include 23,000 police and military and 32,000 POW and foreign workers.
 -Killed in 1945 Land Battles- This is a rough estimate made in 1956 for Germany in current post war borders, not including the former German territories in post war Poland. However, there is a more recent estimate of 22,000 civilians killed during the fighting in Berlin only.
 -Military Dead - Includes Wehrmacht as well as SS/police and paramilitary forces. The Statistisches Bundesamt put the total at 3,760,000. The Overmans study of German military casualties put the total at about 4.4 million.
 -POW still held by Allies- 1,750,000 POW from Germany within in the 1937 borders were still held by the allies in October 1946. Total German POW held at that time were about 2.5 million, including 300,000 men from other nations conscripted by Nazi Germany not included in the 1939 population and 384,000 POW held in Germany who are included in the 1946 census figures. By 1950 almost all POW had been released except for 29,000 men held in forced labor in the USSR or convicted as war criminals.
 -Germans remaining in Poland in October 1946 were 1,750,000, but by 1950 the number had been reduced to 1,100,000 because of expulsions after October 1946. Those remaining in 1950 became Polish citizens but were German nationals in 1939.
 -Germans Remaining Abroad-Includes expelled Germans who had emigrated to other countries or were in Denmark.
 -Expulsion and Deportation Dead - This estimate is only for the Oder-Neisse region of Germany in the 1937 borders, not including the ethnic Germans of other Eastern European nations. Figure includes civilian deaths in the 1945 military campaign, the forced labor in the USSR as well as excess deaths due to post war famine and disease. The German Church Service put the total of confirmed expulsion dead at about 300,000 for Germany in the 1937 borders, the balance of 960,000 were reported as missing and whose fate had not been clarified.
 -Emigrated & Murdered Jews- The Statistisches Bundesamt (German government Statistical Office) gave a total of 200,000 Jews who had emigrated or were murdered, they did not estimate those actually who were murdered. Most sources outside of Germany put the Holocaust death toll in Germany at about 150,000 Jews.
 -Net Emigration of Foreign Population - The Statistisches Bundesamt pointed out that this was a rough estimate.
 -Other, Misc. - The Statistisches Bundesamt defined the others as "emigrated Germans, POW remaining abroad voluntarily, and German concentration camp deaths" (deutsche KZ-Opfer).
 -Population October 1946 Census- Figure of 65,310,000 does not include 693,000 displaced persons (DPs) living in Germany. Figure includes 853,000 in the Saarland.

Population balance for Austria
The Austrian government provides the following information on human losses during the rule of the Nazis.

Population balance for the ethnic Germans of Eastern Europe
In 1958 the West German government statistical office put the losses of the ethnic Germans at 1,318,000 (886,000 civilians in the expulsions and 411,000 in the German military and 22,000 in the Hungarian and Romanian military) The research of Rüdiger Overmans puts military losses of ethnic Germans at 534,000Ingo Haar points out that of the 886,000 estimated civilian dead from east Europe only about 170,000 deaths have been confirmed; the balance are considered unsolved cases.

Controversies over German losses
In post-war Germany the fate of civilians and prisoners of war has been a contentious topic. The current view of the German government is that these losses were due to an aggressive war started by the German nation.  However, there are fringe groups who attempt to trivialize the crimes of the Hitler period by comparing German losses to the Holocaust.

The bombing of Dresden and the bombing campaign in general has been a topic of discussion in post-war Germany. Amongst others, the German historian Wolfgang Benz believes that the use of the term "Bombing Holocaust" runs contrary to historical fact. The German government currently places the ultimate blame for the mass flight and expulsion on the wartime policy of the Nazis in Eastern Europe. There are those like Heinz Nawratil who try to equate the expulsions from Eastern Europe with the Holocaust. The German historian Martin Broszat (former head of Institute of Contemporary History in Munich) described Nawratil's writings as "polemics with a nationalist-rightist point of view", and that Nawratil "exaggerates in an absurd manner the scale of 'expulsion crimes'". The Federation of Expellees has represented the interests of Germans from Eastern Europe. Erika Steinbach, the current President of the Federation, provoked outrage when she supported the statements of other members of the expellee organization claiming that Hitler's attack on Poland was a response to Poland's policy. The Federation of Expellees initiated the formation of the Center Against Expulsions. The former President of Germany Joachim Gauck and the former German chancellor Angela Merkel have voiced support for the Center Against Expulsions. However, in Poland it is viewed by some as an attempt to reopen the wounds of the war and to revert to pre-war borders.

The fate of over one million missing German soldiers in the USSR was an issue in post-war West Germany, with some claiming that they were held in secret labor camps by the Soviets. It is now known that they did not survive the war, Rüdiger Overmans believes that more than likely they died in Soviet custody.

James Bacque, a Canadian author with no previous historical research experience, has written a book Other Losses in which he claims that the United States are responsible for the deaths of 800,000 to 1,000,000 German POW. Based on his own research Bacque claims that documents from the US Archives show that there were 800,000 German POW who did not survive US captivity. Bacque alleges that General Eisenhower and the US military deliberately withheld support for the German POW, causing their deaths. Bacque presents his arguments with a description of the horrific conditions at the Rheinwiesenlager POW camps and eyewitness accounts of retired US military officers. Bacque maintains that there has been a conspiracy by the United States to cover up these losses. Bacque's book received wide attention when it was first published in 1989, since then his claims have been challenged by historians who have found his thesis to be unsubstantiated. The US military historian Stephen Ambrose was co-editor of the book Eisenhower and the German POWs in which he refutes Bacque's claims. Ambrose maintains that the figure of 800,000 POW missing from the US records was a bookkeeping error, that many POW were released and no records were maintained. Ambrose points out that the US and the UK had to cope with a major logistical problem in order to maintain the huge number of surrendered German personnel and finds the claim that Eisenhower and the US military deliberately withheld support for the German POW to be without merit. Rüdiger Overmans believes that "on the basis of factual individual data, shown before, the thesis of the Canadian James Bacque cannot be supported".

Database of Fallen Soldiers 
The organisation was founded on 16 December 1919 to look after the World War I soldiers' graves. Later on, it commenced to track German casualties again starting from 1946 after the World War II. Currently, the commission runs an online database in which soldiers' family can search for the missing relatives.

Estimates indicate that at least 40,000 war casualties are found a year. The commission has already built more than 300 cemeteries from World War II and 190 from World War I all over Europe.

Notes

German casualties of World War II
Military history of Germany during World War II